is a railway station operated by East Japan Railway Company (JR East) in the town of Futaba, Fukushima, Japan.

Lines
Futaba Station is served by the Jōban Line, and is located 263.7 km from the official starting point of the line at Nippori Station. However, due to the Fukushima Daiichi nuclear disaster, services were suspended until 14 March 2020, when this station was reopened.

Station layout
Futaba Station has one side platform connected to the station building overhead. Prior to the Fukushima Daiichi nuclear disaster, a second platform was in use and the station was staffed.

Platforms

History
It was renamed Futaba in 1959. The station was absorbed into the JR East network upon the privatization of the Japanese National Railways (JNR) on 1 April 1987. The station was closed on 11 March 2011 following the Fukushima Daiichi nuclear disaster. Services between Namie and  reopened on March 14, 2020.

Passenger statistics
In fiscal 2010, the station was used by an average of 542 passengers daily (boarding passengers only).

Surrounding area
Futaba is within the evacuation zone surrounding the Fukushima Daiichi Nuclear Power Plant. Since June 2015 it has been possible for residents to enter the area, but remaining in the area overnight is prohibited.

Futaba Town Hall
Futaba Post Office

See also
 List of railway stations in Japan

References

External links

  

Railway stations in Fukushima Prefecture
Jōban Line
Railway stations in Japan opened in 1898
Railway stations closed in 2011
Stations of East Japan Railway Company
Futaba, Fukushima